The Stanford Web Credibility Project, which involves assessments of website credibility conducted by the Stanford University Persuasive Technology Lab, is an investigative examination of what leads people to believe in the veracity of content found on the Web.  The goal of the project is to enhance website design and to promote further research on the credibility of Web resources.

Origins

The Web has become an important channel for exchanging information and services, resulting in a greater need for methods to ascertain the credibility of websites.  In response,  since 1998, the Stanford Persuasive Technology Lab (SPTL) has investigated what causes people to believe, or not, what they find online.  SPTL provides insight into how computers can be designed to change what people think and do, an area called captology. Directed by experimental psychologist B.J. Fogg, the Stanford team includes social scientists, designers, and technologists who research and design interactive products that motivate and influence their users.

Objectives

The ongoing research of the Stanford Web Credibility Project includes:

 Performing quantitative research on Web credibility
 Collecting all public information on Web credibility
 Acting as a clearinghouse for this information
 Facilitating research and discussion about Web credibility
 Collaborating with academic and industry research groups

How Do People Evaluate a Web Site's Credibility?

A study by the Stanford Web Credibility Project, How Do People Evaluate a Web Site's Credibility? Results from a Large Study, published in 2002, invited 2,684 "average people" to rate the credibility of websites in ten content areas.  The study evaluated the credibility of two live websites randomly assigned from one of ten content categories:  e-commerce, entertainment, finance, health, news, nonprofit, opinion or review, search engines, sports, and travel.  A total of one hundred sites were assessed.

This study was launched jointly with a parallel, expert-focused project conducted by Sliced Bread Design, LLC. In their study, Experts vs. Online Consumers:  A Comparative Credibility Study of Health and Finance Web Sites, fifteen health and finance experts were asked to assess the credibility of the same industry-specific sites as those reviewed by the Stanford PTL consumers.  The Sliced Bread Design study revealed that health and finance experts were far less concerned about the surface aspects of these industry-specific types of sites and more concerned about the breadth, depth, and quality of a site's information.  Similarly, Consumer Reports WebWatch, which commissioned the study, has the goal to investigate, inform, and improve the credibility of information published on the World Wide Web.  Consumer Reports had plans for a similar investigation into whether consumers actually perform the necessary credibility checks while online, and had already conducted a national poll concerning consumer awareness of privacy policies.

The common goals of the three organizations led to a collaborative research effort that may represent the largest web credibility project ever conducted.  The project, based on three years of research that included over 4,500 people, enabled the lab to publish Stanford Guidelines for Web Credibility, which established ten guidelines for building the credibility of a website.

Findings

The study found that when people assessed a real website's credibility, they did not use rigorous criteria, a contrast to earlier national survey findings by Consumer Reports WebWatch, A Matter of Trust: What Users Want From Web Sites (April 16, 2002).   The data showed that the average consumer paid far more attention to the superficial aspects of a site, such as visual cues, than to its content.  For example, nearly half of all consumers (or 46.1%) in the study assessed the credibility of sites based in part on the appeal of the overall visual design of a site, including layout, typography, font size and color schemes.

This reliance on a site's overall visual appeal to gauge credibility occurred more often with some categories of sites then others.  Consumer credibility-related comments about visual design issues occurred with more frequency with websites dedicated to finance, 54.6%, search engines, 52.6%, travel, 50.5%, and e-commerce sites, 46.2%, and less frequently when assessing health, 41.8%, news, 39.6%, and nonprofit, 39.4%.

"I would like to think that when people go on the Web they're very tough integrators of information, they compare sources, they think really hard," says Fogg, "but the truth of the matter--and I didn't want to find this in the research but it's very clear--is that people do judge a Web site by how it looks. That's the first test of the Web site.  And if it doesn't look credible or it doesn't look like what they expect it to be, they go elsewhere.  It doesn't get a second test.  And it's not so different from other things in life. It's the way we judge automobiles and politicians.

Recommended guidelines

See also
 Persuasive technology
 Web literacy (Credibility)

External links
 credibility.stanford.edu - Stanford Web Credibility Project website
 WebCredibility.org (discontinued around 2007-2008, this domain appears to be an alias for the content still available at credibility.stanford.edu) - 'Stanford Guidelines for Web Credibility:  How can you boost your web site's credibility?  We have compiled 10 guidelines for building the credibility of a website. These guidelines are based on three years of research that included over 4,500 people.', Stanford University
 Stanford.edu - 'What's Captology?'  The Stanford Persuasive Technology Lab
 ConsumerWebWatch.org - 'How Do People Evaluate a Web Site's Credibility?  Results from a Large Study (October 29, 2002)
 EContentInstitute.org - 'A good first impression:  Stanford's Web credibility project reveals that the secret to repeat Web site traffic may be in the first click', Sue Bowness (January/February 2004)

Media studies
Web Credibility Project
Software projects